Nigar Ahmed (16 February 1945 – 24 February 2017) was a Pakistani women’s rights activist who founded the Women’s Action Forum and Aurat Foundation. She died aged 72.

Early life and education
Ahmed was born in Lahore in 1945, to Riazuddin Ahmad and Akhtar. She got her early education from the Convent of Jesus and Mary. She did Masters in Economics from Government College Lahore. She was a member of the Government College Dramatics Club and later editor of the famous magazine Ravi. Later she went to New Hall, Cambridge, on a Commonwealth scholarship. After coming back, she taught Economics in Quaid-i-Azam University.

Feminism
Soon after formation of Women's Action Forum in 1981 in Karachi, Ahmed started the Islamabad and Lahore chapters in 1982. While living in Islamabad for nearly sixteen years, she stayed involved in the women’s movement.
She co-founded Aurat Foundation in 1986 with the late Shehla Zia under the dictatorship era of Zia ul Haq.

Personal life
Ahmed married Tariq Siddiqi, a civil servant, in Swat. They had two sons together, Bilal and Ahmad. Her husband and both sons got Ph.D. degrees.

Death
Ahmed was diagnosed with Parkinson’s disease in 2001. In 2017, she was suffering with chest infection and admitted to a hospital in Lahore, where she died.

Awards
In 2005, her name was nominated for Nobel Peace Prize among other Pakistani women.

In 2010, she received Mohtarma Fatima Jinnah Life Time Achievement Award.

References

1945 births
2017 deaths
Pakistani women's rights activists
People from Lahore
Pakistani women activists
Pakistani feminists